Mustafa Amhaouch (born 27 June 1970) is a Dutch politician, he has been a member of the House of Representatives of the Netherlands for the Christian Democratic Appeal since 12 January 2016, when he replaced Peter Oskam. Previously he served as municipal councillor in Helden between 1997 and 2006.

Career
Amhaouch was born on 27 June 1970 in Panningen. His parents had immigrated from Morocco seven years before. Amhaouch received his primary education in Helden, afterwards he attended the lower technical school in Panningen from 1985 to 1988. The three subsequent years he attended the middle technical school in Venlo. He studied control theory at the Fontys University of Applied Sciences in Venlo from 1991 to 1995.

After finishing his education Amhaouch worked for Philips Medical Systems for a year. He then became an engineer and later manager at ASML, where he worked from 1996 to 2016, when he was appointed to the House of Representatives of the Netherlands.

Amhaouch was a member of the municipal council of Helden for the Christian Democratic Appeal (CDA) between March 1997 and 16 March 2007, serving as group leader between 2004 and 2006. In the Parliamentary elections of 2010 Amhaouch occupied number 41 on the Christian Democratic Appeal party list, he was not elected. In the Parliamentary elections of 2012 he occupied place sixteen on the list and was not elected.

On 12 January 2016 Amhaouch joined the House of Representatives of the Netherlands when he replaced Peter Oskam. He was the first CDA Representative of Moroccan descent, and the first Muslim since 2012. In the House he is occupied with internal affairs, Kingdom relations, technology and ICT.

Amhaouch was made member of the Order of Orange-Nassau on 27 April 2007.

References

External links
  Parlement.com biography

1970 births
Living people
20th-century Dutch engineers
21st-century Dutch engineers
21st-century Dutch politicians
Christian Democratic Appeal politicians
Dutch Muslims
Dutch people of Moroccan descent
Members of the House of Representatives (Netherlands)
Municipal councillors in Limburg (Netherlands)
People from Peel en Maas
Recipients of the Order of Orange-Nassau